Aleksei Aleksandrovich Petrov (born 8 September 1974) is a retired Russian weightlifter. He had his peak performance in 1994, when he won the European and world titles and set four world records: one in the snatch, two in the clean and jerk, and one in the total. In 1996, he won gold in the  class at the 1996 Olympics and set his second world record in the snatch. At the 2000 Olympics he finished third in the  class. His last international success was a European gold achieved in 2002. The Russian Olympic Committee selected younger competitors in favor of Petrov for the 2004 Olympics, partly because of his injuries, excessive weight, and a failed drug test. Meanwhile, his season best was  higher than the gold medal result at those Olympics.

Petrov graduated from the Volgograd Academy of Physical Education. His weightlifting idol was David Rigert, and his first coaches were his father and elder brother. In 2004 he got engaged, had a daughter born the following year and officially retired from competition in 2006. In 2009, he became deputy director of sport administration of Volgograd.

References

External links

 
 
 Alexei Petrov at Database Weightlifting 
 
 

1974 births
Living people
Russian male weightlifters
Weightlifters at the 1996 Summer Olympics
Weightlifters at the 2000 Summer Olympics
Olympic weightlifters of Russia
Olympic gold medalists for Russia
Olympic bronze medalists for Russia
Sportspeople from Volgograd
Olympic medalists in weightlifting
Medalists at the 2000 Summer Olympics
Medalists at the 1996 Summer Olympics
European Weightlifting Championships medalists
20th-century Russian people
21st-century Russian people